The Second Wilson Ministry was the 12th Ministry of the Government of Western Australia and was led by Liberal Premier Frank Wilson. It succeeded the Scaddan Ministry on 27 July 1916 after a vote of no confidence passed in the Legislative Assembly, due mainly to the Labor Party losing its one-seat majority through a by-election and a member resigning from the party to become an independent. In early 1917, the Liberal Party was consumed by the Nationalist Party, to whom most of its members pledged their allegiance. Its leader, Sir Henry Lefroy, formed the Lefroy Ministry on 28 June 1917.

The following ministers served for the duration of the Ministry:

References

  (no ISBN)

Wilson 2
Ministries of George V